= Saista Khedi =

- village
- Location within Madhya Pradesh Location within India
- Coordinates: 23.1938753°N 77.2203966°E
- Country: India
- State: Madhya Pradesh
- District: Bhopal
- Tehsil: Huzur
- Elevation: 517 m (1,696 ft)

Population (2011)
  - Total: 713
- Time zone: UTC+5:30 (IST)
- ISO 3166 code: MP-IN
- 2011 census code: 482491

Saista Khedi is a village in the Bhopal district of Madhya Pradesh, India. It is located in the Huzur tehsil and the Phanda block.

The Baba Dayadas temple, constructed with funding in crores from the villagers, is located in Saista Khedi. A special prayer, which is conducted in the temple every Monday evening, attracts people from the entire village as well as neighbouring areas.

== Demographics ==
According to the 2011 census of India, Saista Khedi has 152 households. The effective literacy rate (i.e. the literacy rate of population excluding children aged 6 and below) is 89.05%.

Demographics (2011 Census)
	Total	Male	Female
Population	713	382	331
Children aged below 6 years	74	39	35
Scheduled caste	200	105	95
Scheduled tribe	0	0	0
Literates	569	318	251
Workers (all)	270	208	62
Main workers (total)	230	198	32
Main workers: Cultivators	156	134	22
Main workers: Agricultural labourers	22	18	4
Main workers: Household industry workers	4	4	0
Main workers: Other	48	42	6
Marginal workers (total)	40	10	30
Marginal workers: Cultivators	24	3	21
Marginal workers: Agricultural labourers	15	6	9
Marginal workers: Household industry workers	0	0	0
Marginal workers: Others	1	1	0
Non-workers	443	174	269
